Home is a 2013 American drama film written and directed by Jono Oliver and starring Gbenga Akinnagbe, Danny Hoch, Joe Morton, Tawny Cypress, K.K. Moggie and James McDaniel.

Cast
Gbenga Akinnagbe as Jack Hall
Danny Hoch as Dundee
Tawny Cypress as Laura
Joe Morton as Donald Hall
K.K. Moggie as Denise
James McDaniel as Dr. Parker

Release
The film was released theatrically in Manhattan on November 22, 2013.  Then it was released on DVD and on-demand on March 25, 2014.

Reception
The film has an 88% rating on Rotten Tomatoes based on eight reviews.

Stephanie Merry of The Washington Post gave the film a positive review and wrote, "Oliver is off to a promising start. Let’s hope it’s enough to get his next go-round a wider theatrical release."

Inkoo Kang of the Los Angeles Times also gave the film a positive review and wrote, "The great achievement in writer-director Jono Oliver’s poignant, superb debut, Home, lies in the balance between the film’s empathy for those like Jack who seek independence and its compassion for others who may need care indefinitely."

The Hollywood Reporter also gave the film a positive review: "This movingly understated drama benefits from strong performances and incisive characterizations."

Miriam Bale of The New York Times gave the film a negative review and wrote, "With awkward slow-motion effects, clunky transitions and pregnant zooms that seem conspicuously in the wrong speed or otherwise a little off, Mr. Oliver’s film aims for a glossy mainstream aesthetic without the budget or skills to match."

References

External links
 
 
 

2013 films
2013 drama films
American drama films
2010s English-language films
2010s American films